Carolina Maria Teresa Giuseppa of Parma (22 November 1770 – 1 March 1804) was a Princess of Parma by birth, and Princess of Saxony by marriage to Prince Maximilian of Saxony. Carolina was the eldest child of Ferdinand, Duke of Parma, and his wife Archduchess Maria Amalia of Austria.

Biography
Her full baptismal name was Carolina Maria Teresa Giuseppa Giovanna. She was named after her godparents, her paternal great-uncle Charles III of Spain and her maternal grandmother Empress Maria Theresa.

Carolina was the eldest child of Ferdinand, Duke of Parma and his wife Maria Amalia of Austria. By the time of the visit of her maternal aunt Maria Christina in Parma in 1774, she was described as a beautiful but melancholic child. Carolina and her brother Louis were the favorites of their parents. They were personally instructed in religion by their father, despite the fact that their younger children were actually more interested in the subject than them. In 1778, her brother Luigi hit his head on a marble table while playing with Carolina, and afterward suffered from epilepsy.

The mother of Carolina preferred her to marry a German prince. Reportedly, however, her marriage was not arranged. Instead, her mother introduced Carolina to Maximilian during his frequent trips to Italy, and when the Parmesan Ducal family visited Saxony in the late 1780s, Carolina was able to spend time with Maximilian and reportedly fell in love with him. Consequently, she was described as eager to marry him, and her mother Amalia gave her permission despite the fact that Maximilian was not the heir to a throne. The marriage and life of Carolina in Saxony are described as happy and harmonious. When her mother moved to Prague in 1804, she was able to have more contact with her, though she was not able to visit her before her death.

Princess Carolina died of fever on March 1, 1804 in Dresden. More than two decades after, her husband married her niece Princess Maria Luisa Carlota of Parma.

Marriage and issue

On 22 April 1792 in Parma (by proxy) and on 9 May 1792 (in person), Carolina married Prince Maximilian of Saxony, fifth and youngest son of Elector Frederick Christian of Saxony.

They had seven children:

Maria Amalia (b. Dresden, 10 August 1794 – d. Pillnitz, 18 September 1870), known as Amalia. Had one issue. 
Maria Ferdinanda (b. Dresden, 27 April 1796 – d. Schloss Brandeis, Bohemia, 3 January 1865), known as Maria; married on 6 May 1821 to Ferdinand III, Grand Duke of Tuscany (father-in-law of her younger sister). Had no issue.
Frederick Augustus II (b. Dresden, 18 May 1797 – d. Brennbüchel, 9 August 1854), King of Saxony (1836). Had one illegitimate issue.
Clemens Maria Joseph (b. Dresden, 1 May 1798 – d. Pisa, 4 January 1822), known as Klemens. Had no issue. 
Maria Anna (b. Dresden, 15 November 1799 – d. Pisa, 24 March 1832), known as  Anna; married on 16 November 1817 to Leopold II, Grand Duke of Tuscany. Had three issue.
Johann I (b. Dresden, 12 December 1801 – d. Pillnitz, 29 October 1873), King of Saxony (1854). Had nine issue.
Maria Josepha Amalia (b. Dresden, 6 December 1803 – d. Aranjuez, 17 May 1829), known as  Josepha; married on 20 October 1819 to King Ferdinand VII of Spain. Had no issue.

Ancestry

References

Princesses of Bourbon-Parma
1770 births
1804 deaths
Nobility from Parma
House of Bourbon-Parma
Burials at Dresden Cathedral
⚭Princess Carolina of Parma
Daughters of monarchs